Olli Herman Kosunen (born 19 May 1983), also known as H. Olliver Twisted, is a Finnish singer who has played in the Swedish glam metal band Crashdïet. Twisted is currently a member of the Finnish glam metal band Reckless Love.

Career 
Before he was a member of Crashdïet, he was a member of the Finnish rock band Reckless Love. They released an EP in 2006 called Speed Princess. In 2007 he joined the Swedish hard rock band Crashdïet, to replace their former singer Dave Lepard; who died in January of the previous year. Twisted released one album with Crashdïet, The Unattractive Revolution, which featured the singles; "In the Raw" and "Falling Rain". He went on a world tour with the band to support the album. On 13 July 2008, Twisted left Crashdïet so he could spend more time in his other band, Reckless Love.

Reckless Love released their self-titled debut album on 24 February 2010, and a second album, Animal Attraction, on 5 October 2011.

Private life 

Twisted married his girlfriend Noora Niemelä on 11 February 2012 in Tampere, Finland. Furthermore, Herman and Noora are the main characters in the Reckless Love music video "Animal Attraction". On 9 February 2017, he confirmed that day's headlines in the Finnish press about him and Noora Niemelä getting divorced. 

In February 2022, Herman became the father of a son.

Discography

With Crashdïet 
The Unattractive Revolution (2007)

Singles/EPs
"In the Raw" (2007)
"Falling Rain" (2008)

With Reckless Love 
Reckless Love (2010)
Animal Attraction (2011)
Spirit (2013)
InVader (2016)
Turborider (2022)

Singles/EPs
"So Happy I Could Die" (2013)
"Nights on Fire" (2013)
"Hot" (2011)
"Badass/Get Electric" (2010)
"Romance" (2010)
"Beautiful Bomb" (2009)
"One More Time" (2009)
"Speed Princess" (2006)
"Light But Heavy" (2005)
"TKO" (2005)
"So Yeah!!" (2004)

References

External links 
Official Crashdïet website
Official Reckless Love website
Neon-lights.info 
Stalker.cd

1983 births
Living people
Finnish heavy metal singers
21st-century Finnish male singers
The Local Band members
Crashdïet members